Brij Bhushan Lal was an Indian politician.  He was elected to the Lok Sabha, the lower house of the Parliament of India from the Bareilly, Uttar Pradesh as a member of the Bharatiya Jana Sangh.

References

External links
Official biographical sketch in Parliament of India website

Bharatiya Jana Sangh politicians
1905 births
Year of death missing